The 2021 Dutch Boy 150 was the fourth stock car race of the 2021 ARCA Menards Series season and the second iteration of the event. The race was held on Saturday, May 1, 2021 in Kansas City, Kansas at Kansas Speedway, 1.5 miles (2.4 km) permanent D-shaped oval racetrack. The race took the scheduled 100 laps to complete. At race's end, Ty Gibbs would dominate, leading every lap to win his 10th career ARCA Menards Series win and the second of the season. To fill out the podium, Drew Dollar and Corey Heim, both driving for Venturini Motorsports would finish second and third, respectively.

Background 

Kansas Speedway is a 1.5-mile (2.4 km) tri-oval race track in Kansas City, Kansas. It was built in 2001 and hosts two annual NASCAR race weekends. The NTT IndyCar Series also raced there until 2011. The speedway is owned and operated by the International Speedway Corporation.

Entry list

Qualifying 
Qualifying would take place on Saturday, May 1, at 10:00 AM CST.

No drivers would fail to qualify.

Full qualifying results

Race results

References 

2021 ARCA Menards Series
NASCAR races at Kansas Speedway
Dutch Boy 150
Dutch Boy 150